The 2011 Interlake Pharmacy Classic is being held from November 18 to 21 at the Stonewall Curling Club in Stonewall, Manitoba as part of the 2011–12 World Curling Tour. The purses for the men's and women's were CAD$21,000 and CAD$11,250, respectively.

Men

Teams

A Event

B Event

C Event

Playoffs

Women

Teams

A Event

B Event

Consolation

Playoffs

References

External links

Interlake Pharmacy Classic
Interlake Pharmacy Classic
Curling in Manitoba